is a town located in Miyagi Prefecture, Japan. , the town had an estimated population of 11,790, and a population density of 77 persons per km² in 4,493 households.

Geography
Zaō is located in the Tōhoku region of northern Japan in southwestern Miyagi Prefecture in the Ōu Mountains, bordered by Yamagata Prefecture to the west. Parts of the town are within the borders of Zaō Quasi-National Park and Zaō Kōgen Prefectural Natural Park.

Neighboring municipalities
Miyagi Prefecture
Shiroishi
Shichikashuku
Ōgawara
Murata
Kawasaki
Yamagata Prefecture
Kaminoyama

Climate
Zaō has a humid climate (Köppen climate classification Cfa) characterized by mild summers and cold winters.

Demographics
Per Japanese census data, the population of Zaō has declined by approximately 30 percent from its peak in the 1950s.

History
The area of present-day Zaō was part of ancient Mutsu Province, and was part of the holdings of Sendai Domain under the Edo period Tokugawa shogunate. It was made part Katta District in the new Iwaki Province at the start of the Meiji period. The district was transferred to Miyagi Prefecture on 21 August 1876. The villages of Enda and Miyamura was established on April 1, 1889 with the establishment of the post-Meiji restoration modern municipalities system. The two villages merged on April 1, 1955 to form the town of Zaō.

Government
Zaō has a mayor-council form of government with a directly elected mayor and a unicameral town council of 16 members. Zaō, collectively with the city of Shiroishi and the town of Shichikashuku, contributes two seats to the Miyagi Prefectural legislature. In terms of national politics, the town is part of Miyagi 3rd district of the lower house of the Diet of Japan.

Economy
The economy of Zaō is largely based on agriculture (primarily through the use of polytunnels) and forestry and seasonal tourism.

Education
Zaō has five public elementary schools and three public middle schools operated by the town government, and one public high school operated by the Miyagi Prefectural Board of Education.

Transportation
Zaō does not have any passenger train service.

Highway
  – Zaō Parking Area

Local attractions 
Mount Zaō 
Zaō Quasi-National Park
Zaō Kōgen Prefectural Natural Park
Sankai Falls

References

External links

Official Website 

 
Towns in Miyagi Prefecture